

See also
 Outline and timeline of the Greek genocide

References

Greco-Turkish War (1919–1922)